Ruel Sotiriou (born 24 August 2000) is a professional footballer who plays for Leyton Orient, as a striker. Born in England, he has represented Cyprus at under-19 and under-21 levels.

Career

Orient debut and early loans
Sotiriou made his first team debut for Orient as a substitute in the goalless draw with Dagenham & Redbridge in the FA Cup Fourth Qualifying Round on 14 October 2017. He then made further substitute appearances in two home league defeats against Macclesfield Town and Gateshead in late October. On 4 November, he appeared as a late substitute for Zain Westbrooke in the 2–1 defeat at Gillingham in the FA Cup First Round. He then played in the 3–0 league defeat at Torquay United on 25 November.

He joined Heybridge Swifts on a month's loan in December 2017, scoring on his debut in the 3–3 draw at Waltham Abbey on 30 December. He also scored in the 3–3 draw with Grays Athletic on 6 January 2018.

On 29 January he made a further switch to Leatherhead on a work experience deal. Again he scored on his debut, opening the scoring in the second minute of Leatherhead's 4–1 win at Hendon on 30 January.

On 18 September 2018, Sotiriou went on loan to Bishop's Stortford of the Isthmian League Premier Division, making four appearances. At the end of October, he made a fourth loan move, this time to National League South club Chelmsford City, where he made two appearances.

On 22 February 2019, Sotiriou went on a month's loan to Hampton & Richmond Borough, which was later extended until the end of the season. He scored six goals in nine appearances for Hampton, including both goals in the 2–1 win at home to Wealdstone on 13 April.

Dover Athletic and return to Orient
On 1 November 2019, he joined National League side Dover Athletic on a month's loan. His debut came in the FA Cup First Round tie at home to EFL League One side Southend United on 10 November. Coming on as an 81st minute substitute for Steven Rigg, Sotiriou scored the only goal of the game three minutes later. He later said, "For the goal I literally took a touch out of my feet, I was going to square it to Inih but I thought 'No I'm going to take a shot'." On 26 November, Sotiriou scored twice in the 4–3 league defeat at home to Maidenhead United.

Returning to Orient on 28 November, Sotiriou came on as a second-half substitute for Conor Wilkinson in the EFL Trophy Second Round match at Bristol Rovers on 4 December. The tie ended 1–1, and Sotiriou missed the last penalty as Orient lost 4–2 in the shoot-out.

Sotiriou made his Football League debut on 26 December 2019, coming on as a second-half substitute for Dan Happe, and scoring in the 3–1 home defeat to Colchester United. He scored in the second minute of his next match, the 1–1 draw at Newport County on 29 December.

After scoring six goals in eight matches, Sotiriou was awarded the EFL League Two Player of the Month award for March 2022, his goals helping steer Orient away from the relegation zone.

International career
Sotiriou made his debut for Cyprus internationally in March 2019 when he appeared in the 2020 UEFA European Under-19 Championship qualification for Cyprus, but these were cancelled during the qualification due to Covid-19. He first appeared with the Cyprus U21 team in their attempt to qualify for the 2021 UEFA European Under-21 Championship in the autumn of 2019.

Career statistics

Honours
Individual
EFL League Two Player of the Month: March 2022

References

External links

2000 births
Living people
Cypriot footballers
Cyprus youth international footballers
English footballers
Association football forwards
Leyton Orient F.C. players
Heybridge Swifts F.C. players
Leatherhead F.C. players
Bishop's Stortford F.C. players
Chelmsford City F.C. players
Hampton & Richmond Borough F.C. players
Dover Athletic F.C. players
English Football League players
English people of Greek Cypriot descent